Tomáš Bauer (born 26 October 1932) is a Czech diver. He competed in two events at the 1960 Summer Olympics.

References

External links
 
 

1932 births
Living people
Czech male divers
Olympic divers of Czechoslovakia
Divers at the 1960 Summer Olympics
Sportspeople from Prague